The Retrospective Review was an English periodical published from 1820 to 1828. It was founded by Henry Southern, who edited it to 1826, as well as contributing. From 1827 to 1828 Nicholas Harris Nicolas was co-editor with Southern.

It concentrated on Early Modern English literature; John Gross saw it as presaging later academic literary criticism. Contributors included:

George Frederick Beltz
James Crossley
Charles Wentworth Dilke; 
William Ford
Basil Montagu  
William Johnson Fox;
John Hamilton Reynolds;
William Stevenson
Thomas Noon Talfourd.

The title was revived in the 1850s by the publisher John Russell Smith.

Notes

1820 establishments in the United Kingdom
1828 disestablishments in the United Kingdom
Defunct literary magazines published in the United Kingdom
Magazines established in 1820
Magazines disestablished in 1828